Knić is a village and municipality located in the Šumadija District of central Serbia. According to 2011 census, the population of the town is 2,166, while population of the municipality is 14,237.

Settlements
Aside from the town of Knić, the municipality includes the following settlements:

 Bajčetina
 Balosave
 Bare
 Bečevica
 Borač
 Brestovac
 Brnjica
 Bumbarevo Brdo
 Vrbeta
 Vučkovica
 Grabovac
 Grivac
 Gruža
 Guncati
 Dragušica
 Dubrava
 Žunje
 Zabojnica
 Kikojevac
 Kneževac
 Konjuša
 Kusovac
 Lipnica
 Ljuljaci
 Oplanić
 Pretoke

Demographics

As of 2011 census, the municipality has 14,237 inhabitants.

Ethnic groups
The ethnic composition of the municipality:

Economy
The following table gives a preview of total number of registered people employed in legal entities per their core activity (as of 2018):

Famous residents
 Stevan Knićanin, a commander of the Serbian volunteer squads in the Serbian Vojvodina during the 1848/1849 revolution.

References

External links

 

Populated places in Šumadija District
Municipalities and cities of Šumadija and Western Serbia